The 1983 Men's South American Volleyball Championship, the 15th tournament, took place in 1983 in São Paulo.

Final positions

Mens South American Volleyball Championship, 1983
Men's South American Volleyball Championships
1983 in South American sport
International volleyball competitions hosted by Brazil 
1983 in Brazilian sport